Padam also known as Bor-abor, is a dialect of the Mishing language.

Phonology 
The Padam dialect consists of the following:

Consonants 

 /s/ can also be heard as a palatal fricative [ʃ].

Vowels

References 

Tani languages
Languages of Arunachal Pradesh
Languages of Assam